Lake Lynn is a man-made lake in Raleigh, North Carolina. The lake was created for flood control purposes in 1976 by damming Hare Snipe Creek, a tributary of Crabtree Creek. The park includes a  paved trail around the lake (part of the Capital Area Greenway system), as well as a community center, playground, and tennis courts.

Wildlife

Lake Lynn has an aquatic wildlife that includes common varieties of lake fish found in North Carolina. Turtles are also commonly seen in the shallower parts of the lake and it is not uncommon to see the turtles come out of the lake on a sunny day. Snakes and birds are also commonly seen around this mini ecosystem.

See also 
 Crabtree Creek (Neuse River)
 William B. Umstead State Park
 Eno River State Park
 Falls Lake State Recreation Area

References

Lynn
Parks in Raleigh, North Carolina
Lynn